Super Bitch  is a 1973 Italian-British poliziottesco film directed by Massimo Dallamano. It was released in England as Blue Movie Blackmail, and in the U.S. as Mafia Junction.

Cast 
 Ivan Rassimov as Inspector Cliff Hoyst
 Stephanie Beacham as Joann
 Patricia Hayes as Mamma the Turk
 Ettore Manni as Morrel
 Luciano Catenacci as Gamble
 Verna Harvey as Eva
 Giacomo Rossi-Stuart as Marco
 Cec Linder as the American Ambassador
 Gareth Thomas as Trenchcoated Detective

Production
Super Bitch was shot in Safa Palatino in Rome and on location in London, Beirut and Baalbek. The film's score by Riz Ortolani would later be re-used in Red Rings of Fear.

Release
Super Bitch was released in Italy on 3 May 1973 where it was distributed by Medusa. It grossed a total of 353,341,000 lire on its theatrical run in Italy. It was initially released in the United Kingdom under the title Blue Movie Blackmail where it was distributed by Hemdale. The English-language version of the film gave more emphasis to Stephanie Beacham's nude scenes than the thriller plot.

Reception
In a contemporary review, the Monthly Film Bulletin described the film as "a competently, impersonally handled thriller fantasy" and "mere competence can do little to unify this kind of mongrel co-production, or to pump much life into its derivative synthetics".

References

Sources

External links

1973 films
1970s Italian-language films
English-language Italian films
1970s English-language films
Poliziotteschi films
1973 crime films
Films directed by Massimo Dallamano
Films scored by Riz Ortolani
Films shot in London
Films shot in Lebanon
Films shot in Rome
1973 multilingual films
British multilingual films
Italian multilingual films
1970s Italian films